Salazar may refer to:

People and fictional characters 
 Salazar (surname), a surname and list of persons and fictional characters with the surname
 António de Oliveira Salazar (1889–1970), Prime Minister of Portugal from 1932 to 1968
 Salazar Slytherin, a character in the Harry Potter novels

Places 
 Salazar, Burgos, a village
 Salazar de las Palmas, a municipality in the department of North Santander, Colombia
 Salazar Valley, a valley in the eastern part of the autonomous community of Navarre, Spain

Aircraft
 Salazar, a de Havilland DH.88 Comet aircraft

See also
 Trimeresurus salazar, a pit viper named after Salazar Slytherin
 Vila Salazar, former name for N'dalatando, town and commune in the province of Cuanza Norte, Angola